Tarzan and the Mermaids is a 1948 adventure film based on the Tarzan character created by Edgar Rice Burroughs. Directed by Robert Florey, it was the last of twelve Tarzan films to star Johnny Weissmuller in the title role. It was also the first Tarzan film since 1939 not to feature the character Boy, adopted son of Tarzan and Jane. (Boy was described in the film as being away at school, and the character never returned to the series.)

Plot

The setting is a coastal African village where swimming and diving are central to the culture, hence the term "the Mermaids." Tarzan and Jane (Brenda Joyce) help a native girl (Linda Christian) who has fled the village to avoid a forced marriage to a supposed local god. George Zucco portrays Palanth, the corrupt high priest attempting to force the girl into marriage, and Fernando Wagner plays a con man impersonating the god Balu.

Cast
 Johnny Weissmuller as Tarzan  
 Brenda Joyce as Jane  
 George Zucco as Palanth, the High Priest  
 Andrea Palma as Luana, Mara's Mother  
 Fernando Wagner as Varga, Pearl Trader  
 Edward Ashley as Commissioner  
 John Laurenz as Benji  
 Gustavo Rojo as Tiko, Mara's Fiancé  
 Matthew Boulton as British Inspector-General  
 Linda Christian as Mara

Production
The film was shot in Mexico by RKO during its collaboration with Churubusco Studios at Acapulco, Teotihuacan and Mexico City. It was the first official Tarzan film to be filmed outside the United States since Herman Brix's The New Adventures of Tarzan. Writing in Turner Classic Movies, Richard Harlan Smith reported that "[s]ets were destroyed by storms, Sol Lesser suffered a heart attack that necessitated his departure from the location, and Weissmuller experienced a case of sunburn which required him to wear make-up for the first time in his career."

The film is noted for its cinematography by Gabriel Figueroa, exotic Mexican scenery and coastal locales, a Dimitri Tiomkin score and much group singing.

Deaths
Two members of the film crew were killed during production. One Mexican crew member was crushed by a motorboat whilst Angel Garcia, a stunt diver who doubled for Tarzan's high dive, was killed after he survived the dive but was swept by the surf into the rocks below the cliff.

Reception
Author and film critic Hal Erickson described the film in AllMovie as a "diverting Tarzan adventure" despite "jungle settings [that] don't look particularly African." Critic Graeme Clark wrote that Weissmuller "seemingly spen[t] half the movie freestyling through the waves, diving off cliffs and venturing to the sea bed where he could get up to such business as battling a giant octopus for no other reason than the plot needed a spot of peril" and "if you could put up with singer John Laurenz as a Boy substitute (many cannot) then the skill of veteran director Robert Florey kept it rattling along."

References

External links

 
 
 
 Tarzan and the Mermaids history at ERBzine.com

1948 films
1940s fantasy films
American fantasy films
American sequel films
1940s English-language films
Films scored by Dimitri Tiomkin
Films directed by Robert Florey
Films shot in Mexico
Tarzan films
Films produced by Sol Lesser
American black-and-white films
RKO Pictures films
1940s American films